In mathematics, the limit inferior and limit superior of a sequence can be thought of as limiting (that is, eventual and extreme) bounds on the sequence. They can be thought of in a similar fashion for a function (see limit of a function). For a set, they are the infimum and supremum of the set's limit points, respectively. In general, when there are multiple objects around which a sequence, function, or set accumulates, the inferior and superior limits extract the smallest and largest of them; the type of object and the measure of size is context-dependent, but the notion of extreme limits is invariant. 
Limit inferior is also called infimum limit, limit infimum, liminf, inferior limit, lower limit, or inner limit; limit superior is also known as supremum limit, limit supremum, limsup, superior limit, upper limit, or outer limit.

The limit inferior of a sequence  is denoted by

and the limit superior of a sequence  is denoted by

Definition for sequences
The  of a sequence (xn) is defined by

or

or

The limits superior and inferior can equivalently be defined using the concept of subsequential limits of the sequence . An element  of the extended real numbers  is a subsequential limit of  if there exists a strictly increasing sequence of natural numbers  such that .
 
and 

If the terms in the sequence are real numbers, the limit superior and limit inferior always exist, as the real numbers together with ±∞ (i.e. the extended real number line) are complete. More generally, these definitions make sense in any partially ordered set, provided the suprema and infima exist, such as in a complete lattice.

Whenever the ordinary limit exists, the limit inferior and limit superior are both equal to it; therefore, each can be considered a generalization of the ordinary limit which is primarily interesting in cases where the limit does not exist. Whenever lim inf xn and lim sup xn both exist, we have

The limits inferior and superior are related to big-O notation in that they bound a sequence only "in the limit"; the sequence may exceed the bound. However, with big-O notation the sequence can only exceed the bound in a finite prefix of the sequence, whereas the limit superior of a sequence like e−n may actually be less than all elements of the sequence. The only promise made is that some tail of the sequence can be bounded above by the limit superior plus an arbitrarily small positive constant, and bounded below by the limit inferior minus an arbitrarily small positive constant.

The limit superior and limit inferior of a sequence are a special case of those of a function (see below).

The case of sequences of real numbers 

In mathematical analysis, limit superior and limit inferior are important tools for studying sequences of real numbers. Since the supremum and infimum of an unbounded set of real numbers may not exist (the reals are not a complete lattice), it is convenient to consider sequences in the affinely extended real number system: we add the positive and negative infinities to the real line to give the complete totally ordered set [−∞,∞], which is a complete lattice.

Interpretation 

Consider a sequence  consisting of real numbers. Assume that the limit superior and limit inferior are real numbers (so, not infinite).
In other words, any number larger than the limit superior is an eventual upper bound for the sequence.
In other words, any number below the limit inferior is an eventual lower bound for the sequence.

Properties 

The relationship of limit inferior and limit superior for sequences of real numbers is as follows:

As mentioned earlier, it is convenient to extend  to  Then,  in  converges if and only if

in which case  is equal to their common value. Since the limit inferior is at most the limit superior, the following conditions hold 

On the other hand, there exists a  so that for all  

To recapitulate:

 If  is greater than the limit superior, there are at most finitely many  greater than  if it is less, there are infinitely many.
 If  is less than the limit inferior, there are at most finitely many  less than  if it is greater, there are infinitely many.

In general, 

The liminf and limsup of a sequence are respectively the smallest and greatest cluster points.

 For any two sequences of real numbers  the limit superior satisfies subadditivity whenever the right side of the inequality is defined (that is, not  or ): 

Analogously, the limit inferior satisfies superadditivity: 

 For any two sequences of non-negative real numbers  the inequalities  and 
hold whenever the right-hand side is not of the form 

If  exists (including the case ) and  then  provided that  is not of the form

Examples 

 An example from number theory is  where  is the -th prime number.
 The value of this limit inferior is conjectured to be 2 – this is the twin prime conjecture – but  has only been proven to be less than or equal to 246.

Real-valued functions 

Assume that a function is defined from a subset of the real numbers to the real numbers. As in the case for sequences, the limit inferior and limit superior are always well-defined if we allow the values +∞ and −∞; in fact, if both agree then the limit exists and is equal to their common value (again possibly including the infinities). The difference between the two is a rough measure of how "wildly" the function oscillates, and in observation of this fact, it is called the oscillation of f at 0. This idea of oscillation is sufficient to, for example, characterize Riemann-integrable functions as continuous except on a set of measure zero. Note that points of nonzero oscillation (i.e., points at which f is "badly behaved") are discontinuities which, unless they make up a set of zero, are confined to a negligible set.

Functions from topological spaces to complete lattices

Functions from metric spaces 

There is a notion of limsup and liminf for functions defined on a metric space whose relationship to limits of real-valued functions mirrors that of the relation between the limsup, liminf, and the limit of a real sequence.

and

Note that as ε shrinks, the supremum of the function over the ball is monotone decreasing, so we have

and similarly

Functions from topological spaces 

This finally motivates the definitions for general topological spaces. Take X, E and a as before, but now let X be a topological space. In this case, we replace metric balls with neighborhoods:

(there is a way to write the formula using "lim" using nets and the neighborhood filter). This version is often useful in discussions of semi-continuity which crop up in analysis quite often. An interesting note is that this version subsumes the sequential version by considering sequences as functions from the natural numbers as a topological subspace of the extended real line, into the space (the closure of N in [−∞,∞], the extended real number line, is N ∪ {∞}.)

Sequences of sets 

The power set ℘(X) of a set X is a complete lattice that is ordered by set inclusion, and so the supremum and infimum of any set of subsets (in terms of set inclusion) always exist. In particular, every subset Y of X is bounded above by X and below by the empty set ∅ because ∅ ⊆ Y ⊆ X. Hence, it is possible (and sometimes useful) to consider superior and inferior limits of sequences in ℘(X) (i.e., sequences of subsets of X).

There are two common ways to define the limit of sequences of sets. In both cases:
 The sequence accumulates around sets of points rather than single points themselves. That is, because each element of the sequence is itself a set, there exist accumulation sets that are somehow nearby to infinitely many elements of the sequence.
 The supremum/superior/outer limit is a set that joins these accumulation sets together. That is, it is the union of all of the accumulation sets. When ordering by set inclusion, the supremum limit is the least upper bound on the set of accumulation points because it contains each of them. Hence, it is the supremum of the limit points.
 The infimum/inferior/inner limit is a set where all of these accumulation sets meet. That is, it is the intersection of all of the accumulation sets. When ordering by set inclusion, the infimum limit is the greatest lower bound on the set of accumulation points because it is contained in each of them. Hence, it is the infimum of the limit points.
 Because ordering is by set inclusion, then the outer limit will always contain the inner limit (i.e., lim inf Xn ⊆ lim sup Xn). Hence, when considering the convergence of a sequence of sets, it generally suffices to consider the convergence of the outer limit of that sequence.
The difference between the two definitions involves how the topology (i.e., how to quantify separation) is defined. In fact, the second definition is identical to the first when the discrete metric is used to induce the topology on X.

General set convergence

A sequence of sets in a metrizable space  approaches a limiting set when the elements of each member of the sequence approach the elements of the limiting set. In particular, if  is a sequence of subsets of  then:
The limit  exists if and only if  and  agree, in which case  The outer and inner limits should not be confused with the set-theoretic limits superior and inferior, as the latter sets are not sensitive to the topological structure of the space.

Special case: discrete metric
This is the definition used in measure theory and probability. Further discussion and examples from the set-theoretic point of view, as opposed to the topological point of view discussed below, are at set-theoretic limit.

By this definition, a sequence of sets approaches a limiting set when the limiting set includes elements which are in all except finitely many sets of the sequence and does not include elements which are in all except finitely many complements of sets of the sequence. That is, this case specializes the general definition when the topology on set X is induced from the discrete metric.

Specifically, for points x, y ∈ X, the discrete metric is defined by

under which a sequence of points (xk) converges to point x ∈ X if and only if xk = x for all but finitely many k. Therefore, if the limit set exists it contains the points and only the points which are in all except finitely many of the sets of the sequence. Since convergence in the discrete metric is the strictest form of convergence (i.e., requires the most), this definition of a limit set is the strictest possible.

If (Xn) is a sequence of subsets of X, then the following always exist:
 lim sup Xn consists of elements of X which belong to Xn for infinitely many n (see countably infinite). That is, x ∈ lim sup Xn if and only if there exists a subsequence (Xnk) of (Xn) such that x ∈ Xnk for all k.
 lim inf Xn consists of elements of X which belong to Xn for all except finitely many n (i.e., for cofinitely many n). That is, x ∈ lim inf Xn if and only if there exists some m > 0 such that x ∈ Xn for all n > m.
Observe that x ∈ lim sup Xn if and only if x ∉ lim inf Xnc.
 lim Xn exists if and only if lim inf Xn and lim sup Xn agree, in which case lim Xn = lim sup Xn = lim inf Xn.
In this sense, the sequence has a limit so long as every point in X either appears in all except finitely many Xn or appears in all except finitely many Xnc.

Using the standard parlance of set theory, set inclusion provides a partial ordering on the collection of all subsets of X that allows set intersection to generate a greatest lower bound and set union to generate a least upper bound. Thus, the infimum or meet of a collection of subsets is the greatest lower bound while the supremum or join is the least upper bound.  In this context, the inner limit, lim inf Xn, is the largest meeting of tails of the sequence, and the outer limit, lim sup Xn, is the smallest joining of tails of the sequence. The following makes this precise. 
Let In be the meet of the nth tail of the sequence. That is,

The sequence (In) is non-decreasing (i.e. In ⊆ In+1) because each In+1 is the intersection of fewer sets than In. The least upper bound on this sequence of meets of tails is 

So the limit infimum contains all subsets which are lower bounds for all but finitely many sets of the sequence.

Similarly, let Jn be the join of the nth tail of the sequence. That is,

The sequence (Jn) is non-increasing (i.e. Jn ⊇ Jn+1) because each Jn+1 is the union of fewer sets than Jn. The greatest lower bound on this sequence of joins of tails is 

So the limit supremum is contained in all subsets which are upper bounds for all but finitely many sets of the sequence.

Examples

The following are several set convergence examples. They have been broken into sections with respect to the metric used to induce the topology on set X.

 Using the discrete metric

 The Borel–Cantelli lemma is an example application of these constructs.

 Using either the discrete metric or the Euclidean metric

 Consider the set X = {0,1} and the sequence of subsets:

The "odd" and "even" elements of this sequence form two subsequences, ({0}, {0}, {0}, ...) and ({1}, {1}, {1}, ...), which have limit points 0 and 1, respectively, and so the outer or superior limit is the set {0,1} of these two points. However, there are no limit points that can be taken from the (Xn) sequence as a whole, and so the interior or inferior limit is the empty set { }. That is,
 lim sup Xn = {0,1}
 lim inf Xn = { }
However, for (Yn) = ({0}, {0}, {0}, ...) and (Zn) = ({1}, {1}, {1}, ...):
 lim sup Yn = lim inf Yn = lim Yn = {0}
 lim sup Zn = lim inf Zn = lim Zn = {1}

 Consider the set X = {50, 20, −100, −25, 0, 1} and the sequence of subsets:

As in the previous two examples,
 lim sup Xn = {0,1}
 lim inf Xn = { }
That is, the four elements that do not match the pattern do not affect the lim inf and lim sup because there are only finitely many of them. In fact, these elements could be placed anywhere in the sequence. So long as the tails of the sequence are maintained, the outer and inner limits will be unchanged. The related concepts of essential inner and outer limits, which use the essential supremum and essential infimum, provide an important modification that "squashes" countably many (rather than just finitely many) interstitial additions.

 Using the Euclidean metric

 Consider the sequence of subsets of rational numbers:

The "odd" and "even" elements of this sequence form two subsequences, ({0}, {1/2}, {2/3}, {3/4}, ...) and ({1}, {1/2}, {1/3}, {1/4}, ...), which have limit points 1 and 0, respectively, and so the outer or superior limit is the set {0,1} of these two points. However, there are no limit points that can be taken from the (Xn) sequence as a whole, and so the interior or inferior limit is the empty set { }. So, as in the previous example,
 lim sup Xn = {0,1}
 lim inf Xn = { }
However, for (Yn) = ({0}, {1/2}, {2/3}, {3/4}, ...) and (Zn) = ({1}, {1/2}, {1/3}, {1/4}, ...):
 lim sup Yn = lim inf Yn = lim Yn = {1}
 lim sup Zn = lim inf Zn = lim Zn = {0}
In each of these four cases, the elements of the limiting sets are not elements of any of the sets from the original sequence.

 The Ω limit (i.e., limit set) of a solution to a dynamic system is the outer limit of solution trajectories of the system. Because trajectories become closer and closer to this limit set, the tails of these trajectories converge to the limit set.
 For example, an LTI system that is the cascade connection of several stable systems with an undamped second-order LTI system (i.e., zero damping ratio) will oscillate endlessly after being perturbed (e.g., an ideal bell after being struck). Hence, if the position and velocity of this system are plotted against each other, trajectories will approach a circle in the state space. This circle, which is the Ω limit set of the system, is the outer limit of solution trajectories of the system. The circle represents the locus of a trajectory corresponding to a pure sinusoidal tone output; that is, the system output approaches/approximates a pure tone.

Generalized definitions

The above definitions are inadequate for many technical applications. In fact, the definitions above are specializations of the following definitions.

Definition for a set

The limit inferior of a set X ⊆ Y is the infimum of all of the limit points of the set. That is,

Similarly, the limit superior of X is the supremum of all of the limit points of the set. That is,

Note that the set X needs to be defined as a subset of a partially ordered set Y that is also a topological space in order for these definitions to make sense. Moreover, it has to be a complete lattice so that the suprema and infima always exist. In that case every set has a limit superior and a limit inferior. Also note that the limit inferior and the limit superior of a set do not have to be elements of the set.

Definition for filter bases

Take a topological space X and a filter base B in that space. The set of all cluster points for that filter base is given by

This is clearly a closed set and is similar to the set of limit points of a set. Assume that X is also a partially ordered set. The limit superior of the filter base B is defined as

when that supremum exists.  When X has a total order, is a complete lattice and has the order topology,

Similarly, the limit inferior of the filter base B is defined as

when that infimum exists; if X is totally ordered, is a complete lattice, and has the order topology, then

If the limit inferior and limit superior agree, then there must be exactly one cluster point and the limit of the filter base is equal to this unique cluster point.

Specialization for sequences and nets
Note that filter bases are generalizations of nets, which are generalizations of sequences. Therefore, these definitions give the limit inferior and limit superior of any net (and thus any sequence) as well. The filter base ("of tails") generated by this net is  defined by

Therefore, the limit inferior and limit superior of the net are equal to the limit superior and limit inferior of  respectively. Similarly, for topological space , take the sequence  where  for any . The filter base ("of tails") generated by this sequence is  defined by

Therefore, the limit inferior and limit superior of the sequence are equal to the limit superior and limit inferior of  respectively.

See also
 Essential infimum and essential supremum
 Envelope (waves)
 One-sided limit
 Dini derivatives
 Set-theoretic limit

References

External links

 

Limits (mathematics)